The River Pirate is a 1928 American drama film directed by William K. Howard and written by Malcolm Stuart Boylan, Ben Markson and John Reinhardt, based on the 1928 novel by Charles Francis Coe. The film stars Victor McLaglen, Lois Moran, Nick Stuart, Earle Foxe, Donald Crisp and Bob Perry. The film was released on August 26, 1928, by Fox Film Corporation.

Cast
Victor McLaglen as Sailor Fritz
Lois Moran as Marjorie Cullen
Nick Stuart as Sandy
Earle Foxe as Shark
Donald Crisp as Caxton
Bob Perry as Gerber

References

External links 
 

1928 films
1920s English-language films
Fox Film films
1928 drama films
Films directed by William K. Howard
American black-and-white films
1920s American films
Silent American drama films